In mathematics, the argument shift method is a method for constructing functions in involution with respect to Poisson–Lie brackets, introduced by . They used it to prove that the Poisson algebra of a finite-dimensional semisimple Lie algebra contains a complete commuting set of polynomials.

References

 English translation: Math. USSR-Izv. 12 (1978), no. 2, 371–389

Lie algebras